The 2019 PGA Tour Latinoamérica was the eighth season of PGA Tour Latinoamérica. PGA Tour Latinoamérica is operated and run by the PGA Tour. The season began in March at the Buenaventura Classic in Panama and concluded in December with the Shell Tour Championship at Trump National Doral Miami.

Schedule
The following table lists official events during the 2019 season.

Order of Merit
The Order of Merit was based on prize money won during the season, calculated in U.S. dollars. The top five players on the tour earned status to play on the 2020–21 Korn Ferry Tour.

Developmental Series
The following table lists Developmental Series events during the 2019 season.

Notes

References

PGA Tour Latinoamérica
PGA Tour Latinoamerica